The Hellenic Police (Ellinikí Astynomía, abbreviated ) is the national police service and one of the three security forces of the Hellenic Republic. It is a large agency with responsibilities ranging from road traffic control to counter-terrorism. Police Lieutenant General Lazaros Mavropoulos currently serves as Chief of the Hellenic Police. He replaced Konstantinos Skoumas. The Hellenic Police force was established in 1984 under Law 1481/1-10-1984 (Government Gazette 152/A/8-10-1984) as the result of the fusion of the Gendarmerie (Chorofylakí, 1833-1984) and the Cities Police (Astynomía Póleon, 1921-1984) forces.        

According to Law 2800/2000, the Hellenic Police is a security organ whose primary aims are:
 Ensuring peace and order as well as citizens' unhindered social development, a mission that includes general policing duties and traffic safety.
 Prevention and suppression of crime as well as protecting the state and its democratic form of government within the framework of the constitutional order, a mission which includes the implementation of public and state security policy.
 Prevent illegal entry and exit of foreigners in and out of Greece and control of compliance with the provisions related to the entry, exit, residence and work of foreigners in the country, a mission that includes the implementation of foreigners and border protection policy duties.
The Hellenic Police is constituted along central and regional lines. The force takes direction from the Minister for Citizen Protection.

The force consists of police officers, civilians, border guards and Special Police Guards. Since the 1990s, the Hellenic Police has been condemned for the association of many of its officers with the far right movement, in particular the Golden Dawn party. Since the beginning of the 2015 European refugee crisis, it has courted controversy because of its pushback policy, which is operated outside of any legal framework.

Structure

Overview
The Hellenic Police force is headed in a de jure sense by the Minister for Citizen Protection, however, although the Minister sets the general policy direction of Greece's stance towards law and order as a whole, the Chief of Police is the day-to-day head of the force. Underneath the Chief of Police is the Deputy Chief of Police whose role is largely advisory, though in the event of the Chief of Police being unable to assume his duties the Deputy Chief will take over as the interim head. Regular meetings are also held with the Council of Planning and Crisis Management who are drawn from the heads of the main divisions of the police force and raise relevant issues with the Chief of Police him/herself. Underneath the Deputy Chief of Police is the Head of Staff, who, in addition to acting as 'Principal' of the Police Academy, heads the Security and Order Branch, Administrative Support Branch and Economical-Technical and Information Support Branch. Equal in rank to the Head of Staff are the General Inspectors of Southern and Northern Greece, who have under their jurisdiction the regional services of both these divisions. The Security and Order Branch is by far the most important, and includes the General Police Division, the Public Security Division and the State Security Division, among others.

Regional jurisdiction
Greece is divided into two sectors for policing, both headed by an Inspector General. These sectors both contain several regions, headed by an Inspector General.

Northern Greece
 East Macedonia and Thrace region
 Central Macedonia region
 West Macedonia region
 Thessaly region
 Epirus region
 North Aegean region

Southern Greece
 Central Greece region
 Peloponnese region
 West Greece region
 Ionian Islands region
 South Aegean region
 Crete region

Special services 
The Hellenic Police force has several special services divisions under the authority of the Chief of Police and working in conjunction with regional and other police sectors where necessary, these are as follows:
 
 Cyber Crime Division ( - )
 Special Violent Crime Squad ( - )
 Forensic Science Division ( - ) 
 Division of Internal Affairs ( - ')
 International Police Cooperation Division ( - )
 Informatics Division ( - )
 Special Suppressive Antiterrorist Unit ( - )
 Department of Explosive Devices Disposal ( - )
 Hellenic Police Air Force Service ( - )
 Zeta Group (Motorcycle Police) ( - )
 Teams of Bicycle-mounted Police ( - )
 Force of Control Fast Confrontation ( - )
 Special Guards ( - )
 Border Guards ( - )
 Road traffic police ( - )
 Units for the Reinstatement of (Public) Order (Riot Police) ( - )
 Unit of Police Dogs ( - )
 University Institutions Protection Teams ( - )

Personnel

Ranks of the Hellenic Police Force

History

19th century   

Though there was what constituted a police force under the provisional Government of Greece during the Greek War of Independence, the first organized police force in Greece was the Greek Gendarmerie which was established in 1833 after the enthronement of King Otho. It was at that time formally part of the army and under the authority of the Defence Ministry (later the entirety of the organization including the Police Academy was brought under its authority). A city police force was also established but its role remained a secondary one in comparison to the Army's role (mainly dealing with illegal gambling, a severe problem at the time), several foreign advisers (particularly from Bavaria, which emphasized elements of centralization and authoritarianism), were also brought in to provide training and tactical advice to the newly formed Police force. The main task of the police force under the army as a whole during this period was firstly to combat theft but also to contribute to the establishment of a strong executive government.

The army's links to the police and the nature of the structure of the police force and its hierarchy (that of being similar to the army) was maintained throughout the 19th century for a number of reasons. Largely the socio-political unrest that characterized the period including disproportionate poverty, governmental oppression, sporadic rebellions and political instability. As a result of this, as well as the input of the armed forces, the police force remained a largely conservative body throughout the period, there was also a certain amount of politicization during training as the police force were trained in military camps.

20th century

In 1906 the Greek police force underwent its first major restructuring at an administrative level. It acquired its own educational and training facilities independent of those of the army (though still remaining titularly part of the armed forces). Despite this the Gendarmarie still maintained a largely military based structured based on its involvement in the Macedonian Struggle, and the Balkan and First World Wars, as a result it tended to neglect civilian matters and was partially unresponsive to the needs of Greek society at the time. However, together with the establishment of a civilian city police force for Athens in 1920 (which would eventually be expanded to the entire country), it set a precedent for further change that came in 1935 because of rapid technological, demographic and economic changes which helped it to become more responsive to civilian policing needs of the time.

However, modernization of the police force was stunted by the successive periods of political instability. The dictatorship of Ioannis Metaxas, compounded with both the Second World War and the Greek Civil War led to a retardation of reform throughout the late 1930s and early to mid-1940s. After the war however, British experts were brought in to help reform the police along the lines of the British Police, as a result, after 1946 the police force ceased to be a part of the Defence Ministry, however even then it did not abandon its military features and was still prevalently a military based institution. The Civil war of the period also contributed to excesses on both sides (government forces and the guerillas of the communist led Democratic Army of Greece), torture and abuse of human rights were widespread especially during the early periods of the war when parts of the country where in a state of near lawlessness. Despite this, after the war the police force did reach a respectable level of civilian policing throughout the mid-1960s which was stunted by the rise to power of the Military dictatorship of the Colonels from 1967 to 1974 where it was largely employed as a method of quelling popular discontent along with the newly established Greek Military Police force of the dictatorship.

After the fall of the Colonels the Greek Military Police was eventually disbanded and Greece became a Republic. Despite strong opposition from the Gendarmerie, in 1984 both the city police and the Gendarmerie were merged into a single unified Greek Police Force which maintained elements of a military structure and hierarchy. Because of the long tradition of militaristic elements within the structure of the police even the Council of State of Greece ruled that the police should be regarded as a military body and that members are not civilians but members of the military engaged in a wider role together with the Armed Forces to supplement the Army in defence of the homeland. This has however in recent years been relegated to policing duties such as border patrols and combating illegal immigration and is not reflective of any de facto military duties outside of that of a defensive role in the event of an invasion. Today the Greek Police assist in training various emerging Eastern European and African police forces and Greece has one of the lowest crime rates within the European Union.

Social service

Since 2012, the Hellenic Police is operating the CyberKid website and the namesake mobile application providing useful information to kids and parents using the internet. 

In 2013, the Cyber Crime Unit of the Hellenic Police, under the auspices of the Ministry of Citizen Protection, organised a number of conferences all over the country, to inform kids and parents about the dangers that a child can have while using the internet.  

A significant part of the training for officers of all posts, is the protection and safeguarding of the well-being of children, while any form of child abuse is faced with the "Zero Tolerance" policy.

Additionally, the Hellenic Police has shown an active support, with a financial donation at the Children's Smile and the reassurance that the agency was, is and will remain "for life", an active supporter of the Organization.

Current issues
There are several current issues affecting the police in Greece today, of particular importance is the rise in drug related crimes, sometimes attributed to increased immigration from Albania and other former Eastern Bloc countries, this has particularly affected Athens and in particular Omonoia Square which has become a central point for drug-related activities within Greece.  

Illegal immigration is also a problem as Greece remains both a destination and transit point for illegal immigrants, particularly from Albania (as well as increasingly African and Asian countries). There has been an effort in recent years to step up the security procedures along Greece's borders (though some allege there has been too much of a heavy handed approach to this issue). The issue of the recruitment of immigrants has also been brought up by opposition PASOK MPs in Parliament several times. 

Greece is also one of the few EU countries where there is a rising crime rate, though comparatively the crime rate is still very low by EU standards. Some also allege there is a division within the Greek Police force between the 'Modern' and 'Traditional' elements, they claim the traditional element is underpinned by the long history of links with the military whereas the 'Modern' element is geared towards the police playing a greater social role in society (for example, drug rehabilitation).

Controversies

Drugs case of Minister of Citizen Protection 
During a check on four persons in the area of Amarousiou on 22 November 2021 by DIAS motorcycle-riding squad police officers, in particular the procedure of identity document (ID) checks and body search after having first ordered from them to place out the items who carry with them, they found drugs. Among the persons was reportedly Dimitris Theodorikakos son of Citizen Protection Minister Panagiotis (Takis) Theodorikakos. The revelation made by a retired brigadier police officer and the newspaper journalist and police editor of Ta Nea and To Vima Vasilis Labropoulos on Mega TV’s Mega Gegonona news program on 2 February 2023 where it presents photographs from the drugs and recording of data of four, referring to the Panagiotis Theodorikakos who reportedly had done intervention in order to cover up and manipulate the case file, to destroy incriminating evidences and material, and to avoid arrest and transfer before a prosecutor. Vasilis Labropoulos commented that "Mega TV and other media had not have intention to refer who is the person checked, hence they referred only [they did not name who are] are from the surrounding of mister Theodorikakos. The revelation of person who is his son he is himself revealed the minister [Panagiotis Theodorikakos]". 

Panagiotis (Takis) Theodorikakos announced he will file a criminal complaint against the retired police officer and Vasilis Labropoulos. Also Dimitris Theodorikakos and former Chief of Hellenic Police Michail Karamalakis announced they will file a criminal complaint against the retired police officer.

Violence
According to some organizations Greek police has been accused of overt and, generally unpunished, brutality, in specific cases like after the 2008 Greek riots and during the 2010–2012 Greek protests sparked by the Greek government-debt crisis. Amnesty international has issued a detailed report on police violence in Greece, concerning its practices in patrolling demonstrations, treatment of illegal immigrants, and other, while the Human Rights Watch has criticized the organization concerning its stance against immigrants and allegations of torture of detainees and the Reporters Without Borders have accused the police of deliberately targeting journalists.  

Furthermore, it has been accused of allegedly planting evidence on detainees and mistreatment of arrested individuals. A 29-year-old Cypriot man, Avgoustinos Dimitriou, has been awarded €300,000 in damages following his videotaped beating by plainclothed police officers during a 2006 demonstration in Thessaloniki.    

In November 2019, Amnesty International again made a report regarding the police violence and the use of torture methods. In 2020, 26-year-old Vasilis Maggos from Volos, was found dead one month after his arrest (during an environmental demonstration) and his beating by police officers that caused him serious organ damage.  

In 2021, the Border Violence Monitoring Network published a report into the use of torture and inhuman treatment during pushbacks by Greek police. They assert that:

 89% of pushbacks carried out by Greek authorities contained one or more forms of violence and abuse that we assert amounts to torture or inhuman treatment
 52% of pushback groups subjected to torture or inhuman treatment by Greek authorities contained minors
 
A special police guard Epaminondas Korkoneas killed 15-year-old Alexandros Grigoropoulos on the night of December 6, 2008, following a verbal altercation with the teenager and his friends.  

On December 5, 2022, in Thessaloniki a 16-year-old Roma youth was fatally shot in the head by a 34-year-old DIAS motorcycle-riding squad officer involved in a chase after the teenager allegedly filled up his pickup truck at a gas station and left without paying the 20 euro bill triggered days of often violent protests in the Thessaloniki and Athens and other parts of Greece. He had been hospitalized for more than a week but he died on 13 December 2022. 

Four police officers were arrested on 11 March 2023, include a higher officer, two lower-ranking policemen and a member of the Special Guard unit were responsible for guarding and transferring detainees, for allegedly beating and torturing a detainee.

A prosecutor has ordered a preliminary investigation into an incident which occurred on Akadimias Street in Athens on 16 March 2023 during general strike where a police tow truck drove at high speed into dumpsters that were being wheeled into the middle of a street by protestors.

Syriza controversy
In 2012, Syriza political party, disagreed with the measures taken by the State authorities and the police against illegal immigration.  

At early November 2012, the Minister of Public Order, Nikos Dendias, accused various MPs of the Coalition of Radical Left of "impersonating authority". According to the accusations the members of the party stopped a number of policemen while they were on duty in order to check their credentials. Moreover, they took photographs of the plainclothes police officers and uploaded them on the internet site of the party (left.gr). The accusations prompted an angry reply from the party's spokesperson, who replied that they are "dirty accusations".

Allegations of ties with the far Right
In a 1998 interview with the newspaper Eleftherotypia, Minister for Public Order Georgios Romaios (PASOK) alleged the existence of "fascist elements in the Greek police", and vowed to suppress them.  

Before the surrender of Androutsopoulos, an article by the newspaper Ta Nea claimed that the neo-Nazi political party Golden Dawn had close relationships with some parts of the Greek police force.  

The newspaper published then a photograph of a typewritten paragraph with no identifiable insignia as evidence of the secret investigation. In the article, the Minister for Public Order, Michalis Chrysochoidis, responded that he did not recollect such a probe. Chrysochoidis also denied accusations that far right connections within the police force delayed the arrest of Periandros. He said that leftist groups, including the ultra-left anti-state resistance group 17 November, responsible for several murders, had similarly evaded the police for decades. In both cases, he attributed the failures to "stupidity and incompetence" on behalf of the force.

Golden Dawn stated that rumors about the organisation having connections to the Greek police and the government are untrue, and that the police had intervened in Golden Dawn's rallies and had arrested members of the Party several times while the New Democracy party was in power (for example, during a rally in Thessaloniki in June 2006, and at a rally for the anniversary of the Greek genocide, in Athens, also in 2006). Also, on January 2, 2005, anti-fascist and leftist groups invaded Golden Dawn's headquarters in Thessaloniki, under heavy police surveillance. Although riot police units were near the entrance of the building alongside the intruders, they allegedly did not attempt to stop their actions.  

The "communicating vessels" between Police and Neo-Nazis re-surfaced on the occasion of riot that broke during protest on march June 28, 2011, when squads of riot police rushed to protect agents provocateurs isolated by the angry crowd, two of them A. Soukaras and A. Koumoutsos both unionists of ETHEL (ΕΘΕΛ) well known for both their extreme opinions, as well as their frequent presence in riots.  

In July 2012, it was reported that Nils Muižnieks, Council of Europe Commissioner for Human Rights, had placed the alleged ties of Greek Police and Golden Dawn under scrutiny, following reports of the Greek state's continued failure to acknowledge the problem.    

According to political analyst Paschos Mandravelis, "A lot of the party's backing comes from the police, young recruits who are a-political and know nothing about the Nazis or Hitler. For them, Golden Dawn supporters are their only allies on the frontline when there are clashes between riot police and leftists.
 
Following the May 6, 2012 Greek Parliamentary election, in which Golden Dawn entered the Greek parliament, it was said that more than one out of two police officers voted for the party in districts adjacent to Athens' Attica General Police Directorate (GADA) The Hellenic Police falsified those claims, some of their arguments were that "The Hellenic Police falsified those claims, some of their arguments were that "the Special Electoral Lists also included civilians and people who reside in municipalities that are different from the municipalities that are registered in their elector lists, a big number of civilians and of non-civilians include, other categories of civil servants (army, navy, airforce, coast guard, firefighting staff, etc.), while in addition many police officers vote in their local constituencies." and "1048th electoral department of the 7th District of the Municipality of Athens, in which police officers of the DIAS / Attica Directorate of Immediate Action exercised their right to vote, golden dawn also gained 11%, ranking third (as in national elections). Finally, in the vast majority of polling stations, in which police officers also voted during the European elections, in various areas (Kaisariani, Ampelokipi, etc.) golden dawn ranked third Since the election, Greek police officers have been implicated in violent incidents between Golden Dawn members and migrants. In September, one police officer was suspended for participating in a Golden Dawn raid against migrant-owned kiosks in an open market at Mesolongi; seven other officers were identified. Anti-fascist demonstrators were allegedly tortured in police custody that same month. In October, Greek police allegedly stood by while Golden Dawn members attacked a theater holding a production of the controversial play Corpus Christi.

Police action for human rights  
The Police Action for Human Rights (DADA) union founded, in 2018 in Athens, to protect the rights of LGBT and female police officers. Some of their basic principles are the protection of human rights, the fight against prejudice and discrimination and the equal treatment of all citizens. The union has participated in events, against homophobia and racism in support of human rights, of the Athens Police Officers Association (EASYA) and representatives in the Panhellenic Federation of Police Employees. They have also participated in the pride together with those who belong to the Democratic Union Police Movement (DEKA), of the Athens Police Officers Association (EASYA) and representatives in the Panhellenic Federation of Police Employees (POASY).

Transportation

The most common police vehicles in Greece are the white with blue stripes Citroën Xsara, Škoda Octavia, Mitsubishi Lancer Evolution X, Hyundai i30, Citroën C4, Citroën C4 Picasso, Suzuki SX4, Jeep Liberty, Peugeot 308, Volkswagen Golf, and Nissan Qashqai. Other vehicles that Greek Police has used throughout the years are the following:
 1984,1985 Mitsubishi Galant
 1985 Mitsubishi Lancer
 1985 Daihatsu Charmant
 1986, 1990, 1992 Nissan Sunny
 1991 Renault 19
 1991 Opel Vectra
 1991 Volvo 460
 1995 Citroën ZX
 1995, 1997 Toyota RAV4
 1995, 1996, 1999, 2000 Opel Astra
 1996 Suzuki Baleno
 1997, 1998 Nissan Primera
 1998,2000 Toyota Corolla
 1998 Citroën Saxo
 1998, 1999 Citroën Xantia
 1998, 1999 Nissan Almera
 1999, 2000 Nissan Terrano II
 2000 Kia Sportage
The original livery featured white roofs and doors, with the rest of the bodyshell in dark blue.
The current livery was first introduced on the Citroën ZX's, although the blue stripe on the earlier models was not reflective, from this became another nickname "stroumfakia"(smurfs) for the Greek police.

Most Greek police vehicles are equipped with a customized Car PC, which offers GPS guidance and is connected directly with the Hellenic "Police On Line" network.

As of 2011, a number of police vehicles are being modified to be equipped with onboard surveillance cameras.

Police equipment
Handguns:
 Beretta M9 (ITA)
 Heckler & Koch USP (GER)
 Smith & Wesson Model 910 (US)
 Ruger GP100 (US)
Submachine guns:
 Heckler & Koch MP5 (GER)
 Uzi (ISR)
 FN P90 (BEL)
Assault rifles:
 FN FAL (BEL)
 AK-47 (RUS)
 AK-74M (RUS)
 M4 carbine (US)
 Kefeus (GR)

Police Academy 
The Hellenic Police Academy was established in 1994 with the voting of law 2226/1994 through Parliament. It is situated in Athens and is under the jurisdiction of the chief of police. However the Chief of Police can make recommendations and act as an advisor to the Minister (i.e. the Minister of Citizen Protection) on improvements and other such issues (for example structural reform) pertaining to the Academy. The Minister and the Chief of Police make annual speeches at the Academy to prospective Police Officers. The school is made up of university professors, special scientists (for areas such as forensics) and high-ranking police officers who have specialist field experience. Entrance to the academy is based on Panhellenic Examinations (which are university level entrance examinations), passing specific athletic requirements and an interview, though it differs depending on which particular school of the academy the student wishes to join.  

The Police Academy includes:
 The School for Police Officers, for high school graduates who wish to become commissioned Police officers(2nd Police Lieutenants), which lasts four years    
 The School for Police Constables, for high school graduates who wish to become Police constables (with investigative duties) 
 The School for Postgraduate Education and lifelong learning.
 The National Security School, for high-ranking police personnel (also open to other categories of public servants such as Firemen).

Training
Hellenic Police has a basic requirement of knowledge which being applied for all positions within the agency. These are the protection of the Constitution, tackling of criminal activities and assisting in disaster situations. The emphasis during training on the support and protection of children is such, that a number of highly successful individuals that were raised as orphans, have stated that they couldn't say with certainty that they would make it all the way to the top, without the social service that the Hellenic Police provided to them during their childhood.

The personnel who are hired as special guards (and then they are promoted to police officers after some years) receive 3 months of training. Τhey mainly have patrolling duties and they can also be part of riot police.

Report complaint
Citizens can contact, either giving their name or anonymously, with the Internal Affairs Service Agency of Law Enforcement Bodies ( - ), which is under the authority of Ministry of Citizen Protection, in order to report complains, offences, abuse of power on-duty or off-duty, mistreatment, ill-treatment, violence, sexual abuse, anti-social behaviour and various other illegal acts committed by Greek police personnel.

See also
 Europol
 Interpol
 N.I.S. of Greece
 Crime in Greece

Notes

External links 
  Hellenic Police official website  
  Hellenic Police official portal 

 
National Central Bureaus of Interpol
1984 establishments in Greece
Emergency services in Greece
Human rights abuses in Greece